"Where the Dead Men Lie" is a poem by Australian poet Barcroft Boake. It was first published in The Bulletin magazine on 19 December 1891, and later in the poet's poetry collection Where the Dead Men Lie, and Other Poems (1897).

Analysis

J. Larcombe in The Worker considered the poem "Boake's masterpiece...In it the young poet expressed his detestation of the cruel, selfish squatters, their inhuman conduct, and the tragedy for which they were responsible."

The Oxford Companion to Australian Literature states "In the poem Boake uses the contemptuous name 'Moneygrub' to denote the typical wealthy absentee landlord who lives in city luxury provided for him by the ordinary men and women of the outback..."

The Cambridge History of Australian Literature described the poem "as by far the bleakest poetic vision" of the Australian landscape as it evokes "a haunted frontier."

Further publications

 The Golden Treasury of Australian Verse edited by Bertram Stevens (1909)
 The Oxford Book of Australasian Verse edited by Walter Murdoch (1918)
 An Anthology of Australian Verse edited by George Mackaness (1952)
 Freedom on the Wallaby : Poems of the Australian People edited by Marjorie Pizer (1953)
 A Book of Australian Verse edited by Judith Wright (1956)
 Favourite Australian Poemsedited by Ian Mudie (1963)
 From the Ballads to Brennan edited by T. Inglis Moore (1964)
 The Penguin Book of Australian Verseedited by Harry Payne Heseltine (1972)
 Australian Verse from 1805 : A Continuum edited by Geoffrey Dutton (1976)
 The Collins Book of Australian Poetry edited by Rodney Hall (1981)
 The Illustrated Treasury of Australian Verse edited by Beatrice Davis (1984)
 Cross-Country : A Book of Australian Verse edited by John Barnes and Brian McFarlane (1984)
 My Country : Australian Poetry and Short Stories, Two Hundred Years edited by Leonie Kramer (1985)
 The Penguin Book of Australian Ballads edited by Elizabeth Webby and Philip Butterss (1993)
 Australian Verse : An Oxford Anthology edited by John Leonard (1998)
 Classic Australian Verse edited by Maggie Pinkney (2001)
 Two Centuries of Australian Poetry edited by Kathrine Bell (2007)
 An Anthology of Australian Poetry to 1920 edited by John Kinsella (2007)
 100 Australian Poems You Need to Know edited by Jamie Grant (2008)
 The Puncher & Wattmann Anthology of Australian Poetry edited by John Leonard (2009)
 Macquarie PEN Anthology of Australian Literature edited by Nicholas Jose, Kerryn Goldsworthy, Anita Heiss, David McCooey, Peter Minter, Nicole Moore and Elizabeth Webby (2009)
 Australian Poetry Since 1788 edited by Geoffrey Lehmann and Robert Gray (2011)

See also
 1891 in poetry
 1891 in literature
 1891 in Australian literature
 Australian literature

References

External links
Where the Dead Men Lie Full text of poem at Australian Poetry Library

Australian poems
1891 poems
Works originally published in The Bulletin (Australian periodical)